Johnstown Magazine is a monthly magazine describing events and activities in the Johnstown, Pennsylvania and surrounding area. The magazine began in April 2005 and is published by Community Newspaper Holdings based in Birmingham, Alabama.

References

External links
 Johnstown Magazine

City guides
Local interest magazines published in the United States
Magazines established in 2005
Magazines published in Alabama
Monthly magazines published in the United States
Mass media in Birmingham, Alabama